Ostrybór  is a village in the administrative district of Gmina Wilga, within Garwolin County, Masovian Voivodeship, in east-central Poland.

In the years 1975-1998 the town administratively belonged to the province of Siedlce.

References

Villages in Garwolin County